The Syngnathidae is a family of fish which includes seahorses, pipefishes, and seadragons (Phycodurus and Phyllopteryx). The fused jaw is one of the traits that the entire family have in common.

Description and biology
Syngnathids are found in temperate and tropical seas across the world. Most species inhabit shallow, coastal waters, but a few are known from the open ocean, especially in association with sargassum mats. They are characterised by their elongated snouts, fused jaws, the absence of pelvic fins, and by thick plates of bony armour covering their bodies. The armour gives them a rigid body, so they swim by rapidly fanning their fins. As a result, they are relatively slow compared with other fish but are able to control their movements with great precision, including hovering in place for extended periods.

Uniquely, after syngnathid females lay their eggs, the male then fertilizes and carries the eggs during incubation, using one of several methods. Male seahorses have a specialized ventral brood pouch to carry the embryos, male sea dragons attach the eggs to their tails, and male pipefish may do either, depending on their species. The most fundamental difference between the different lineages of the family Syngnathidae is the location of male brood pouch. The two locations are on the tail (Urophori) and on the abdomen (Gastrophori). There is also variation in Syngnathid pouch complexity with brood pouches ranging from simple ventral gluing areas to fully enclosed pouches. In species with more developed, enclosed pouches it has been demonstrated that males directly provide their brood with not only nutrients but also immunity to pathogens. Syngnathids with more developed brood pouches are also known to be able to partially or completely abort a brood from a female with low fitness.

A wide variety of mate choice and mating competition has been observed in Syngnathidae. For example, Hippocampus fuscus exhibits conventional sex roles of males competing for female access while Corythoichthys haematopterus is completely sex role reversed. Most conventional sex role syngnathids are monogamous whereas sex role reversed species mostly exhibit polygamous behavior.

Seahorses and pipefish also have a unique feeding mechanism, known as elastic recoil feeding. Although the mechanism is not well understood, seahorses and pipefish appear to have the ability to store energy from contraction of their epaxial muscles (used in upward head rotation), which they then release, resulting in extremely fast head rotation to accelerate their mouths towards unsuspecting prey.

Evolution 
Phylogenetic analysis implies that the most recent common ancestor of all syngnathids was likely pouchless. The family Solenostomidae (ghost pipefish) is a family in the order Syngnathiformes. Female ghost pipefish incubate their developing embryos inside fused pelvic fins. Evolutionary transitions from female to male care are practically nonexistent in teleosts, so brood pouches were likely not ancestral. Genome sequencing supports this, revealing multiple different origins across and within different brood pouch types. Oviparity was the ancestral trait, and the evolution of viviparity must have relied on the evolution and integration of multiple complex traits such as morphology, physiology, and behavior.

Syngnathidae was historically divided into two major lineages based on brood pouch location: Neophinae (located on the trunk) and Syngnathinae (located on the tail). Genome sequencing shows a parallel increase in brood pouch complexity in both Neophinae and Syngnathinae. Some species may have also independently evolved to have trunk brooding phenotypes, separate from the Neophinae. One example of this convergent evolution arises in pygmy seahorses (Hippocampus bargibanti, Hippocampus denise, Hippocampus pontohi). Pygmy seahorses are very small (about 1–2 cm tall) trunk brooders, phylogenetically surrounded by tail brooders. It's likely that the pygmy seahorse once had their brood pouch on their tail. The brood pouch may have moved locations when there was strong a correlated selection for a prehensile tail and diminutive size, resulting in a very small, trunk brooding organism.

Viviparity and male-pregnancy in Syngnathidae have a complex evolutionary history with many independent origins of similar traits. Early members of the family developed traits to limit the presence of deleterious mutations, allowing for more rapid evolution. The advantage of a more controlled and protected embryonic development seemed to be enough to enact evolutionary development throughout Syngnathidae to varying degrees.

In species with the most complex brood pouch systems, many traits (behavioral, physiological, morphological, and immunological) must have co‑evolved to allow for male pregnancy, driven by the increase of the fitness of those individuals’ offspring. The evolution of these traits resulted in a sex-role reversal in which females may exhibit competitive behavior for a mate.

Recent research, especially whole-genome sequencing, has allowed for greatly improved understanding of the evolutionary history of Syngnathidae, but there is still a need for further development in the field. Further investigations into the genetic mechanisms and selective motivation for the evolution of these traits in Syngnathidae may provide insight into the evolution of pregnancy separate from the female reproductive system.

Classification

 Subfamily Hippocampinae
 Genus Hippocampus (seahorses)

 Subfamily Syngnathinae (pipefishes, pipehorses and seadragons)
 Genus Acentronura
 Genus Amphelikturus
 Genus Anarchopterus
 Genus Apterygocampus
 Genus Bhanotia
 Genus Bryx
 Genus Bulbonaricus
 Genus Campichthys
 Genus Choeroichthys
 Genus Corythoichthys
 Genus Cosmocampus
 Genus Doryichthys
 Genus Doryrhamphus
 Genus Dunckerocampus
 Genus Enneacampus
 Genus Entelurus
 Genus Festucalex
 Genus Filicampus
 Genus Halicampus
 Genus Haliichthys
 Genus Heraldia
 Genus Hippichthys
 Genus Histiogamphelus
 Genus Hypselognathus
 Genus Ichthyocampus
 Genus Idiotropiscis
 Genus Kaupus
 Genus Kimblaeus
 Genus Kyonemichthys
 Genus Leptoichthys
 Genus Leptonotus
 Genus Lissocampus
 Genus Maroubra
 Genus Micrognathus
 Genus Microphis
 Genus Minyichthys
 Genus Mitotichthys
 Genus Nannocampus
 Genus Nerophis
 Genus Notiocampus
 Genus Penetopteryx
 Genus Phoxocampus
 Genus Phycodurus
 Genus Phyllopteryx
 Genus Pseudophallus
 Genus Pugnaso
 Genus Siokunichthys
 Genus Solegnathus
 Genus Stigmatopora
 Genus Stipecampus
 Genus Syngnathoides
 Genus Syngnathus
 Genus Trachyrhamphus
 Genus Urocampus
 Genus Vanacampus

Images

References

External links 
 
 
 
 

 
Marine fish families
Taxa named by Constantine Samuel Rafinesque